The Ireland men's national 3x3 team is a national basketball team of Ireland, administered by Basketball Ireland. It represents the country in international 3x3 basketball competitions.

References

Ireland national basketball team
Men's national 3x3 basketball teams